The Atharamura Range starts from Amarpur Sub-division of Gomati District and then enters the Khowai Sub-division of Khowai and runs along the border of West Tripura and North Tripura District.
It is a southern extension of the Siwalik Hills.

Mountain ranges of India
Mountains of Tripura